Bent Harsmann (born 21 January 1945) is a Danish weightlifter. He competed in the men's heavyweight event at the 1972 Summer Olympics.

References

1945 births
Living people
Danish male weightlifters
Olympic weightlifters of Denmark
Weightlifters at the 1972 Summer Olympics
Sportspeople from Copenhagen